63rd may refer to:

Metro stations
Ashland/63rd (CTA station), on the Green Line
East 63rd-Cottage Grove (CTA), on the Green Line
63rd (CTA Red Line), on the Red Line
63rd Street station (SEPTA Market–Frankford Line) on the Market-Frankford Line in West Philadelphia

Railroad stations
63rd Street (Metra station) an electric commuter railroad shared by the Metra Electric service and South Shore Line (NICTD) in Chicago

Trolley stops
63rd and Malvern Loop (SEPTA station) a terminus of one of the SEPTA Subway–Surface Trolley Lines in Northwest Philadelphia
63rd Street station (SEPTA Route 15), a SEPTA Route 15 trolley stop in Carrol Park, Philadelphia

Metro lines
63rd Street Line of the New York City Subway, two lines served by multiple services